The black-and-yellow phainoptila or black-and-yellow silky-flycatcher (Phainoptila melanoxantha) is a species of bird in the family Ptiliogonatidae. It is monotypic within the genus Phainoptila. It is found in Costa Rica and Panama.

Description

The black-and-yellow phainoptila is a small, rotund bird with distinctive yellow flanks. Males have a black back, head and tail, yellow flanks and rump, olive breasts and grey bellies. Females have a black cap, olive breast, rump, wings and tail, yellow flanks, and grey throat, nape, and belly. The young are similar to adult females, but are duller and with no grey on nape and dusky streaking on breast.

Habitat and range
Black-and-yellow phainoptilas are found from Costa Rica to western Panama, in mountains from 1800 m (6000 ft.) to timberline, although they may wander lower after breeding season. They are also found in highland forests and adjacent second growth and gardens.

Habits and voice
Black-and-yellow phainoptilas frequent middle levels and upper understory of highland forests. Eats mainly of berries of trees, epiphytes, and shrubs. Rather sluggish and sedentary, often spends long periods of time stuffing itself with berries from a single tree. Occasionally accompanies sooty-capped bush tanager flocks, but soon lags behind. Occasionally plucks insects from foliage or catches them in the air, though not often. Usually found alone or pairs, forms loose flocks after breeding season.

Call is a high, sharp, thin tsit or tseep, suggesting a much smaller bird. Appears to not sing.

Nesting
The nest is a compact, bulky, cup of green moss, thin stems and fern fronds. Found 5–13 ft. (1.5–4 m) up in a dense shrup or sapling. Lays 2 spotted, greyish-white eggs. Nesting occurs from April to May.

References

black-and-yellow phainoptila
Birds of the Talamancan montane forests
black-and-yellow phainoptila
black-and-yellow phainoptila
Taxonomy articles created by Polbot